Stephen Elliott may refer to:

Entertainment
Stephen Elliott (actor), (1918–2005), American actor
Stephen Elliott (author) (born 1971), American author and activist

Sport
Steve Elliott (footballer, born 1958), English footballer
Steve Elliott (footballer, born 1978), English footballer
Stephen Elliott (footballer) (born 1984), Irish international footballer

Other people
Stephen Elliott Jr. (1830–1866), Confederate general of the American Civil War
Stephen Elliott (bishop) (1806–1866), 37th Bishop of the Protestant Episcopal Church in the United States
Stephen Elliott (botanist) (1771–1830), American legislator, banker, educator and botanist

Fictional characters
Steve Elliot, a character played by Mark Monero in the BBC soap opera EastEnders

See also
Stephan Elliott (born 1964), Australian film director and screenwriter